First Impressions is a compilation album by Australian singer Olivia Newton-John, released in 1974 on the EMI label. The collection presents the main hits of the singer, recorded from 1971 to 1974 – songs from the first three studio albums and the compilation If You Love Me, Let Me Know. 

In Japan, the album was released under the title Let Me Be There and the same cover as on the original album. In Australia and New Zealand, the album was released by Interfusion Records under the title Great Hits! First Impressions and with a modified tracklist (songs from the album Long Live Love were added).

Track listing

Charts

Weekly charts

Year-end charts

References

External links
 

1974 compilation albums
Olivia Newton-John compilation albums
Albums produced by John Farrar
EMI Records compilation albums